The fourth election to the City and County of Swansea Council was held in May 2008. It was preceded by the 2004 election and followed by the 2012 election.

Overview
All council seats were up for election. These were the fourth elections held following local government reorganisation and the abolition of West Glamorgan County Council. The Council remained under no overall control, the Labour Party having lost their majority on the authority in 2004

Candidates
The contests were fought by most of the main parties, with Labour and the Conservatives contesting all but one or two of the seats.

Overall Result

|}

Results

* = sitting councillor in this ward prior to election

Bishopston (one seat)

Bonymaen (two seats)

Castle (four seats)

Clydach (two seats)

Cockett (four seats)

Plaid councilor Keith Morgan had defected to the Liberal Democrats since the previous election.

Cwmbwrla (three seats)

Dunvant (two seats)

Fairwood (one seat)

Gorseinon (one seat)

Gower (one seat)

Gowerton (one seat)

Killay North (one seat)

Killay South (one seat)

Kingsbridge (one seat)

Landore (two seats)

Llangyfelach (one seat)

Llansamlet (four seats)

Lower Loughor (one seat)

Mawr (one seat)

Mayals (one seat)

Elected as a Lib Dem in 2004, Rene Kinzett joined the Conservatives.

Morriston (five seats)

Mynyddbach (three seats)

Newton (one seat)

Oystermouth (one seat)

The former Conservative councillor Joan Peters stood as an Independent, but was defeated.

Penclawdd (one seat)

Penderry (three seats)

Penllergaer (one seat)

Pennard (one seat)

Margaret Smith previously sat as an Independent.

Penyrheol (two seats)

Pontarddulais (two seats)

Sketty (five seats)

Huw Rees was elected as a Conservative in 2004 but subsequently joined the Liberal Democrats.

St Thomas (two seats)

Townhill (three seats)

Uplands (four seats)

Upper Loughor (one seat)

West Cross (two seats)

References

2008
Swansea
21st century in Swansea